Beothuk Lake, formerly Red Indian Lake, is located in the interior of central Newfoundland in the province of Newfoundland and Labrador, Canada. The lake drains into the Exploits River which flows through the interior of Newfoundland and exits into the Atlantic Ocean through the Bay of Exploits. Lloyds River, the Victoria River and Star River feed into the lake.

History
The Beothuk, also known as 'Red Indians,' inhabited several campsites on the shore of the lake. An expedition into the interior by John Cartwright and brother George Cartwright in search of the Beothuk found only abandoned campsites. At the time of their discovery of the lake they named it Lieutenant's Lake and they had assumed that the lake was part of the same system as Lake Mickmack, known today as Grand Lake.

In January 1811, an expedition led by David Buchan travelled up the Exploits River in an attempt to establish friendly relations with the Beothuk; Buchan found them, but the encounter went badly and resulted in the deaths of two marines. John Peyton Jr. led another expedition to the lake in 1819 which also ended in tragedy, resulting in the death of the Beothuk headman Nonosbawsut and the capture of Demasduwit.

Proposed renaming

In April 2021, it was announced that the name of the lake would be changed to "Wantaqo'ti Qospem", which means "peaceful lake" in the Mi'kmaq language. However, following criticism over a lack of consultation, the Newfoundland government announced it was pausing the renaming plans and would be opening a consultation process on the name.
On 4 November 2021, the Government of Newfoundland and Labrador renamed the lake “Beothuk Lake”.

Economy and resources
The interior of Newfoundland became accessible on the completion of the Newfoundland Railway, and the forest surrounding the lake attracted attention. The lake was surveyed in 1899 by Alex McCombie and by 1901 Lewis Miller had set up a logging operation on the shore near the site of Demasduit's capture. A railway branch line to the town of Millertown was constructed, and in 1905 the Anglo-Newfoundland Development (AND) Company acquired a 99-year lease on timber and mineral rights for the land surrounding the lake.

Prospectors for the AND Company also discovered a substantial deposit of base metals on the north shore of the lake, and in 1926 the town of Buchans was established. Mining operations began the following year.

Hydro
A pulp and paper mill was constructed at Grand Falls, further downstream on the Exploits River. The mouth of Beothuk Lake was dammed, creating a vast storage reservoir for a hydroelectric generating plant at the mill in Grand Falls.

Footnotes

References
Marshall, Ingeborg (1996). A History and Ethnography of the Beothuk. McGill-Queen's University Press. .

Lakes of Newfoundland and Labrador